There have been three major oil spills in the Gulf of Mexico:

The Ixtoc I oil spill, from June 1979 to March 1980
The Deepwater Horizon oil spill, from April 2010 to August 2010
The Taylor oil spill, from September 2004 to present